Piracy off the Somali coast has threatened international shipping since the beginning of Somalia's civil war in the early 1990s. This list documents those ships attacked in 2008: for other years, see List of ships attacked by Somali pirates.

January–March

April–June

July–August

September

October–December

  A person has been indicted for negotiating the ransom, and charged with 4 counts of piracy.

References

Piracy in Somalia

2008 in Somalia
2008-related lists
Somalia transport-related lists